Luis Felipe Navas de León is a Puerto Rican politician from the New Progressive Party (PNP). He served as member of the Senate of Puerto Rico from 1993 to 2001.

Navas was elected to the Senate of Puerto Rico in the 1992 general election. He represented the District of Humacao. Navas was reelected at the 1996 general election.

Earned a Juris Doctor from the Interamerican University of Puerto Rico School of Law.

Navas ran for a third term at the 2000 general elections, but was defeated by the candidates of the PPD. After that, he has worked as a Legal Advisor for the Senate.

In 2012, while working as Director of the Office of Technical Evaluations of the Senate, Navas was appointed as alternate member of the Board for the Special Independent Attorney General (or FEI).

See also
21st Senate of Puerto Rico

References

Interamerican University of Puerto Rico alumni
Living people
People from Aguas Buenas, Puerto Rico
Members of the Senate of Puerto Rico
Year of birth missing (living people)